Loucas Haji-Ioannou (15 September 1927 – 17 December 2008) was a Greek-Cypriot shipping entrepreneur. He was one of the handful of Greek ship owners whose fleets dominated the global shipping industry for most of the 20th century. He was the father of the founder of the EasyJet airline, Stelios Haji-Ioannou. He was married to Nedi and at one time lived in Psychiko, Athens.

Family
Born into a poor Greek Cypriot farming family at the village of Pedoulas on September 15, 1927, Haji-Ioannou was the eldest of 12 children.

Early career
Haji-Ioannou left the village school when he was 17 and he worked as a salesman until 1950. His uncle, a trader, hired him as an accountant before appointing him as manager of his office in Saudi Arabia. When his uncle died, Haji-Ioannou started his own import-export business in Saudi Arabia. At the time it was complicated to trade in the Kingdom without a local partner and he became one of the few foreign businessmen to achieve that. Later, during the construction boom of the late 1950s, he became the only importer of Heracles and Titan cement.

In 1959, Haji-Ioannou moved to London and he entered the shipping industry, buying a 10,500-ton dry cargo ship which he named Nedi, after his wife. While living in London, until 1965, he built a fleet of more than 20 cargo vessels and became an important client of British shipbrokers, especially Clarkson plc. Later he moved to Athens and he realised that the future of shipping was in international oil trade.  He bought his first tanker in 1969.

References

1927 births
2008 deaths
Greek businesspeople in shipping
Loucas
People from Nicosia District